Souk El Ghraiyer was one of the souks of the medina of Tunis.

Location 
The souk was located in Bab Menara, near the ministry of defense and souk El Sakkajine.

Products 
It specialized in selling bags made of goat or camel hair.

Evolution 
The souk does not exist anymore. It was demolished for the extension of the military services office on April 11, 2001.

References 

Ghraiyer